Keila Waterfall is a waterfall in Northern Estonia on Keila River. It is the third most powerful waterfall in Estonia after Narva and Jägala.

References

External links

 Picture of Keila Waterfall on the 19th century
 Keila Waterfall virtual tour by foto360.ee

Waterfalls of Estonia
Lääne-Harju Parish
Landforms of Harju County
Tourist attractions in Harju County